The Supermarine Sparrow (later called the Sparrow I) was a British two-seat light biplane designed by R.J. Mitchell and built at Supermarine's works at Woolston, Southampton. It first flew on 11 September 1924. After being rebuilt in 1926 as a parasol monoplane, it was re-designated Sparrow II.

The Sparrow was Supermarine's earliest landplane. It was a wooden two-seat sesquiplane powered by a  Blackburne Thrush. It had foldable wings with different cross sections; to allow the aircraft to take-off and land over short distances, Mitchell gave the wings had a high angle of attack. The Sparrow behaved erratically during tests. It was entered for the 1924 Two-Seater Light Aeroplane Competition but suffered engine failure during the competition. A substitute engine failed during the race, forcing the pilot to land at short notice, and the plane was eliminated. 

Sparrow II was heavier and slower than its predecessor. It was entered for the 1926 competition at Lympne but, having made a force landing near Beachy Head, was eliminated. Mitchell went on to use Sparrow II to test new aerofoil designs for the Air Ministry. It was subsequently sold to a flying club and was scrapped in 1933.

Background 
Following the end of World War I, private flying in the UK was progressed slowly. Ex-military aircraft were generally unsuitable, having been designed during the war to suit specific purposes, and aircraft companies considered that little profit could be obtained from aircraft made for private use. 

In 1923, the Royal Aero Club organised the first of a series of annual flying competitions at Lympne, Kent, for single-seat aircraft. The following year, Supermarine entered the Sparrow was for the Two-Seater Light Aeroplane Competition, which was held in late September and early October 1924.

Design 
The Sparrow was Supermarine's earliest design for a landplane, following the company's change of identity from Pemberton-Billing Ltd in 1916.

Designed by R.J. Mitchell, Supermarine's young chief designer, the Sparrow was a wooden two-seat sesquiplane, with wings that were designed to fold. The two wings had different cross sections. The aircraft was powered by a  Blackburne Thrush piston engine, with dual controls. The engine was, however, untried.

The fuselage was built of fabric-covered plywood. The propellers were made to match the rotation speed of the engine, which, at 3500 rpm, was unusually high. The aircraft's hull and struts were painted dark blue. Mitchell took the need for the aircraft to be able to short take-off and landing runs into his design. He ensured that the wings were given a high angle of attack, providing the fuselage with an upward kink. Both wings were fitted with aerofoils.

Performance

Sparrow I 

Sparrow I first flew on 11 September 1924, piloted by Henri Biard. It was refitted with a modified propeller on 27 September. Its behaviour when being tested was erratic. According to Biard, "it was as impudent as its name implied". The Sparrow was demonstrated before its designer, R.J. Mitchell, and other Supermarine directors. The engine failed when the plane was airborne, and the directors raced towards a hole in a hedge that it had crashed through. Biard was found, unscathed. Attempts to restart the engine failed, and the demonstration was called off. The Sparrow then flew back without further trouble. 

The Air Ministry assessment described the Sparrow as lacking attention to detail—specifically referring to the inadequate design of the landing gear and the excessive number of external controls. The pilot's view from the cockpit was limited by the position of the upper wing.

The three-cylinder radial engine proved to be extremely unreliable, and the Sparrow was eliminated from the light aircraft trial due to engine failure, when a connecting rod failed. An engine substituted to replace the original machine initially refused to start and then seized, forcing Biard to make an emergency landing. 

In the Grosvenor Trophy Race at Lympne on 14 October 1924, it came fourth with a speed of 62.08 mph (99.91 km/h). During the first lap of the race, the Sparrow overtook a Westland biplane and maintained this position until the sixth lap, when it was in turn overtaken by the Bristol Brownie.

The Sparrow was registered as G-EBJP, but it never apparently carried the marking. Photographs of the aeroplane show that it was marked with numbers during the competitions it was entered for.

Sparrow II 

Re-designated the Sparrow II, the aircraft was rebuilt and re-engined with a  Bristol Cherub III engine. It entered the 1926 competition at Lympne as a parasol monoplane. Sparrow II was  heavier and  slower than its predecessor.

Sparrow II was outclassed but successfully passed the elimination trials. It failed to pass the racing starting line; due to poor weather conditions, it made a force landing near Beachy Head on 12 September 1926, with Biard noticing that loose rivets were likely to cause the wings to fall off. Sparrow II was thus eliminated from the competition, which was won by the Hawker Cygnet. Sparrow II competed for two other races the following week, but was unplaced in both. The Sparrow's participation in the 1926 trials delayed work being done at the time on the Supermarine Seamew.

Mitchell used Sparrow II to work with the Air Ministry at RAF Worthy Down, fitting the aircraft with his aerofoil designs for other aircraft, and compare the results obtained with those produced using wind tunnel tests. The aircraft was then sold to the Halton Aero Club. It survived until 1933, when it was scrapped.

Variants 
Sparrow I
Blackburne Thrush-powered biplane.
Sparrow II
Sparrow I modified into a monoplane powered by a Bristol Cherub III piston engine.

Specifications (Sparrow I)

See also

Notes

References

Sources

Further reading 

 
 
 
 

1920s British sport aircraft
Sparrow
High-wing aircraft
Single-engined tractor aircraft
Aircraft first flown in 1924